Teddy's Ready! is an album by saxophonist Teddy Edwards which was recorded in 1960 and released on the Contemporary label.

Reception

AllMusic reviewer Scott Yanow awarded the album 5 stars stating "Edwards has a chance to stretch out and he makes the most of the opportunity, creating some excellent straight-ahead music."

Track listing 
All compositions by Teddy Edwards except as indicated
 "Blues in G"6:48  
 "Scrapple from the Apple" (Charlie Parker)5:46  
 "What's New?" (Johnny Burke, Bob Haggart)3:56  
 "You Name It"4:17  
 "Take the "A" Train" (Billy Strayhorn)7:20  
 "The Sermon" (Hampton Hawes)7:05  
 "Higgins' Hideaway"5:03

Personnel 
Teddy Edwardstenor saxophone
Joe Castropiano
Leroy Vinnegarbass
Billy Higginsdrums

References 

Teddy Edwards albums
1960 albums
Contemporary Records albums